During the 2005–06 English football season, Hull City A.F.C. competed in the Football League Championship.

Season summary
The 2005–06 season was hardly the most exciting in Hull City's history and it was more a season of consolidation after two successive promotions. Hull finished the Championship season in 18th place – a comfortable 10 points clear of relegation and their highest league finish for 16 years.

The successful stint at Hull City saw Taylor linked with the Charlton Athletic manager's job before it was given to Iain Dowie. On 13 June 2006, Taylor left Hull to take up the job vacated by Dowie at Crystal Palace, a club at which he had enjoyed considerable success as a player.

Final league table

Results
Hull City's score comes first

Legend

Football League Championship

FA Cup

League Cup

Squad

Left club during season

Statistics

Appearances, goals and cards
(Starting appearances + substitute appearances)

References

2005-06
Hull City
2000s in Kingston upon Hull